Christian Brothers College (CBC) is a private Catholic school in Adelaide, South Australia. It was founded by a group of Irish Christian Brothers in 1878, and it is now one of three Christian Brothers schools in the state.

CBC is predominantly a secondary school, although it has a primary school campus, and now includes a community childcare centre, with a combined student population of approximately 1135 (as of 2013).

Houses 
Christian Brothers College has six houses. Each house is named after significant people and places that are connected with the story of Edmund Ignatius Rice.

Upon commencement at the college, each student is assigned to one of the six houses:

Notable alumni 
Anthony Byrne, Member of Parliament
John Cahill, Australian rules footballer, Australian Football Hall of Fame inductee
Kevin Crease, news anchor
Louis D'Arrigo, Adelaide United soccer player
C.J. Dennis, poet
David Fitzsimons, Olympic runner
Michael Frederick, Australian rules footballer
Joseph Peter Gardiner, Member of Parliament
George Joseph, 69th Lord Mayor of Adelaide
Chris Kenny, Journalist, author and television host
Stephan Knoll, South Australia Minister for Transport, Infrastructure and Local Government
Aubrey Lewis, professor
Richard Marsland, radio/television host
Paul McGuire, diplomat
Tony Monopoly, singer
John Perin, soccer player
Benedict Samuel, actor
Xavier Samuel, actor
Paul Vasileff, founder of Paolo Sebastian
Frank Walsh, 34th Premier of South Australia

Controversy

In May 2014, the Royal Commission into Institutional Responses to Child Sex Abuse heard that a long line of Christian Brothers accused of child sex abuse were transferred to Christian Brothers College in Adelaide from 1919 to 1969.

On 12 December 2018, a former teacher at Christian Brothers College was sentenced to at least two years in prison for having a sexual relationship with one of her students over a two-month period in 2016.

References

External links 

Old Boys

Educational institutions established in 1878
Catholic primary schools in Adelaide
Catholic secondary schools in Adelaide
Congregation of Christian Brothers secondary schools in Australia
Boys' schools in South Australia
Junior School Heads Association of Australia Member Schools
1878 establishments in Australia
Congregation of Christian Brothers primary schools in Australia